In mathematics, a Sastry automorphism,  is an automorphism of a field of characteristic 2 satisfying some rather complicated conditions related to the problem of embedding Ree groups of type 2F4 into Chevalley groups of type F4.

References

 
 

Finite groups
Finite fields